The Brazil men's national field hockey team represents Brazil in international men's field hockey competitions.

Tournament record

Summer Olympics

Pan American Games

Pan American Cup

South American Games

South American Championship

Pan American Challenge

Hockey World League

Current squad
The following 19 players were named on 19 January 2022 for the 2022 Men's Pan American Cup in Santiago, Chile.

Caps updated as of 28 January 2022, after the match against Mexico.

See also
Brazil women's national field hockey team

References

External links
Official website
FIH profile

field hockey
Americas men's national field hockey teams
Field hockey in Brazil
Men's sport in Brazil